Pir Shafqat Hussain Shah Jilani (born 25 October 1949) is a Pakistani politician who had been a member of the National Assembly of Pakistan, from June 2013 to May 2018.
Died 11 September 2019

Early life
He was born on 25 October 1949.

Political career
He ran for the seat of the National Assembly of Pakistan as an independent candidate from Constituency NA-226 (Mirpurkhas-cum-Umerkot-I) in 2008 Pakistani general election but was unsuccessful. He received 81 votes and lost the seat to Aftab Hussain Shah Jillani.

He was elected to the National Assembly as a candidate of Pakistan Peoples Party (PPP) from Constituency NA-226 (Mirpurkhas-cum-Umerkot-I) in 2013 Pakistani general election. He received 82,017 votes and defeated Shabbir Ahmed Qaimkhani, a candidate of Muttahida Qaumi Movement (MQM).

References

Living people
Pakistan People's Party politicians
Sindhi people
Pakistani MNAs 2013–2018
People from Sindh
1949 births